Park Hae-jung  (born 10 March 1977) is a South Korean women's international footballer who plays as a defender. She is a member of the South Korea women's national football team. She was part of the team at the 2003 FIFA Women's World Cup. On club level she plays for INI Steel in South Korea.

References

1977 births
Living people
South Korean women's footballers
South Korea women's international footballers
Place of birth missing (living people)
2003 FIFA Women's World Cup players
Women's association football defenders
Footballers at the 1998 Asian Games
Asian Games competitors for South Korea